is a Japanese wrestler. He won a gold medal at the 2012 Summer Olympics in London, beating Sushil Kumar of India in the finals of the 66 kg Men's Freestyle Wrestling.

He is Second lieutenant in the Japan Ground Self-Defense Force.

Awards
Tokyo Sports
Wrestling Special Award (2009)

References

External links

 
 Facebook

Living people
1986 births
People from Yamanashi Prefecture
Japanese male sport wrestlers
Japan Ground Self-Defense Force personnel
Olympic wrestlers of Japan
Olympic gold medalists for Japan
Wrestlers at the 2012 Summer Olympics
Asian Games medalists in wrestling
Olympic medalists in wrestling
Wrestlers at the 2010 Asian Games
Medalists at the 2012 Summer Olympics
Recipients of the Medal with Purple Ribbon
World Wrestling Championships medalists
Asian Games gold medalists for Japan

Medalists at the 2010 Asian Games
Asian Wrestling Championships medalists
21st-century Japanese people